The 1983 All-Ireland Under-21 Hurling Championship was the 20th staging of the All-Ireland Under-21 Hurling Championship since its establishment by the Gaelic Athletic Association in 1964. The championship began on 20 April 1983  and ended on 11 September 1983.

Cork were the defending champions, however, they were beaten by Clare in a Munster semi-final replay.

On 11 September 1983, Galway won the championship following a 0-12 to 1-6 defeat of Tipperary in the All-Ireland final. This was their third All-Ireland title in the under-21 grade and their first in five championship seasons.

Results

Leinster Under-21 Hurling Championship

Final

Munster Under-21 Hurling Championship

First round

Semi-finals

Final

Ulster Under-21 Hurling Championship

Final

All-Ireland Under-21 Hurling Championship

Semi-finals

Final

Championship statistics

Miscellaneous

 Laois win the Leinster title for the first and, to date, the only time in their history.
 The All-Ireland semi-final clash between Laois and Galway remains their only ever championship meeting.

References

Under
All-Ireland Under-21 Hurling Championship